This is a list of mayors of Zile, Turkey.

Governors as mayors 1923–1960
After the proclamation of the republic on 29 October 1923, the governor of the city was charged with the duties as deputy mayor. With the municipality act of 3 April 1930, the title of mayor was abandoned and the governor of Istanbul province took over the duties of the mayor. The two separate councils of the province and the municipality were unified. The two councils were reestablished on 1 March 1957.

 1 Bahri Uğur 1923–1926  
 2 Muharrem Alacalı 1926–1932  
 3 Fevzi Eken 1932–1934  
 4 Zihni Aksoy 1934–1938  
 5 Sıtkı Eken 1942–1943  
 6 Kazım Kaleli 1943–1944
 7 Kazım Ahçıoğlu 1944–1946 
 8 Salim Eken 1946– 1948  
 9 Rahmi Kayran 1948–1950
 10 Ahmet Vanlı 1950–1954
 11 İsmail Odabaş 1954–1955
 12 Macir R. Gürsoy 1955–1957
 13 İhsan Sarısoy 1957–1960

Military rule (1960–1963)
After the coup d'etat on 27 May 1960, the military abandoned the mayor and appointed 7 officials until 1963.

 14 Mehmet Güçlü 1960–1963

Elected mayors (1963–1980)
The municipality act of 27 July 1963 enabled the election of the mayor. The polls held on 17 November 1963 were the first regional elections to elect the mayor.

 15 Hüseyin Erdoğan 1963– 1965 
 16 Osman Çetin 1965–1972 
 17 Sabri Ünal Erkol 1972– 1975 
 18 Ahmet Vanlı 1975–1977
 19 Nihat Çamsoy 1977– 1980

Military rule (1980–1984)
During the military rule from 12 September 1980 until 1984, mayors were assigned. At this time, Nihat Çamsoy was the mayor.

 20 Nurettin Kocaman 12 September 1980 – 26 March 1984

Elected mayors (since 1984)

 21 Nurettin Türkyılmaz 26 March 1984 – 1991 – ANAP
 22 Şükrü Serimer 1991 – 27 March 1994 – MHP
 23 Murat Tezcan 27 March 1994 – 18 April 1999 – CHP 
 24 Murat Avalıoğlu 18 April 1999 – 2009 – MHP
 25  Lütfi Vidinel July 2009 – Present – AKParti

Zile